Amy Lauren Ruth Rutberg (born November 11, 1981) is an American actress. She is known for her role as Marci Stahl in Daredevil.

Early life
Born in Los Angeles, Rutberg became interested in acting at a young age after watching a production of Peter Pan and she was "carried away screaming...because she was certain Peter would be back to fly her to Neverland". She transferred to University of California, Los Angeles where she continued to study other subjects like law. Just before turning seventeen, she acquired an agent and began to pursue acting.

Career

Rutberg starred in the a cappella musical comedy Perfect Harmony at the Clurman Theatre in New York City. She made guest appearances in the shows Blindspot, NCIS: New Orleans, The Blacklist, Elementary and Taken.

In 2015, Rutberg made her debut in Daredevil as Marci Stahl, girlfriend to Foggy Nelson.  Although the character of Marci was originally cast to appear only in one episode, she would go on to be a recurring character through the first three seasons, with a guest appearance in The Defenders.

In 2018, Rutberg joined the cast of the ABC television reboot of the Blaxploitation series Get Christie Love!. However, ABC later announced that it had decided not to pick the pilot up to series.

Personal life
Amy Rutberg is married and has one child.

Filmography

References

External links

Living people
1981 births
Actresses from Los Angeles County, California
American television actresses
University of California, Los Angeles alumni
Citrus College alumni
21st-century American actresses